David Miguel Delfino Teles (born 23 May 1998) is a Portuguese footballer who plays as a midfielder for Sintrense.

Career
On 23 July 2017, Teles made his professional debut with Académica de Coimbra in a 2017–18 Taça da Liga match against Arouca. He subsequently made his 2017–18 LigaPro debut in August 2017 as a substitute against União Madeira.

References

1998 births
Living people
People from Elvas
Sportspeople from Portalegre District
Portuguese footballers
Association football midfielders
Liga Portugal 2 players
Campeonato de Portugal (league) players
Associação Académica de Coimbra – O.A.F. players
S.U. Sintrense players